Lambert Castle, originally called Belle Vista, is located within the Garret Mountain Reservation in Paterson, Passaic County, New Jersey. The building was built in 1892 and was added to the National Register of Historic Places on June 3, 1976, for its significance in art, architecture, and industry.

History

Lambert Castle was built in 1892 as the home of Catholina Lambert, the owner of a prominent silk mill in the City of Paterson. Constructed in the Medieval Revival architectural style, Mr. Lambert's dream was to build a home reminiscent of the castles in Great Britain that he remembered from his boyhood years. President William McKinley and Vice President Garret Hobart visited the castle in 1898.
In June 1910, filmmaker D. W. Griffith shot The Call To Arms on the grounds. The film was released in July 1910. The cast included Mary Pickford (in her only male role) and Henry B. Walthall. Film Preservation Society, Inc. is currently restoring the film as part of The Biograph Project.

After Lambert's death in 1923, his family sold the building to the City of Paterson, which in turn sold it to Passaic County a few years later. Passaic County used the building for administrative offices, and in 1936, provided one room to the fledgling Passaic County Historical Society to serve as its historical museum. As time went by the museum grew, room by room, until the entire first floor became the historical museum.

In the late 1990s, the Castle underwent a multimillion-dollar restoration and all four floors of the building were developed into a museum and library.

Construction
Construction began on the castle in 1891. The castle was built on the side of the First Watchung Mountain out of sandstone and granite. The sandstone was quarried from the surrounding hills. The initial construction cost was estimated at a half a million dollars. In 1896, an art gallery was added to the castle and a 70-foot observation tower was constructed on the crest of the cliff.

The gallery wing fell into disrepair and was demolished in 1936. The observation tower was open to the public until the late 1960s when it was closed due to disrepair.

In 2014 the Garret Rock Observation tower renovations were completed and the observation tower was reopened to the public.  Admission to the tower is free with panoramic views available from the top.

Gallery

See also
Great Falls (Passaic River)
National Register of Historic Places listings in Passaic County, New Jersey
List of museums in New Jersey

References

 6.In the Beauty of the Lilies, page 1. John Updike, 1996.

External links

 Lambert Castle Museum - official site

Buildings and structures in Paterson, New Jersey
Houses on the National Register of Historic Places in New Jersey
Houses completed in 1892
Houses in Passaic County, New Jersey
Historic house museums in New Jersey
Museums in Passaic County, New Jersey
Watchung Mountains
National Register of Historic Places in Passaic County, New Jersey
Stone houses in New Jersey
New Jersey Register of Historic Places
1892 establishments in New Jersey